Greenvale Farm is an historic farm and 19th-century summer estate at 582 Wapping Road in Portsmouth, Rhode Island.  Historically used for farmland, a portion of this  was transformed into an expansive country estate in the 1860s by John Barstow, a Boston merchant.  It is located at the end of a narrow dirt lane, and is set overlooking the Sakonnet River.  The main house, designed by John Hubbard Sturgis and built in 1864–65, is an exuberant implementation of the Stick style with Gothic features.  It has asymmetric form, with a variety of projections, dormers, gables, and cross-gables, with a variety of exterior finishes.  The estate continues to be owned by Barstow descendants.

The estate was listed on the National Register of Historic Places in 1980.

See also
National Register of Historic Places listings in Newport County, Rhode Island

References

Houses on the National Register of Historic Places in Rhode Island
Houses in Newport County, Rhode Island
Buildings and structures in Portsmouth, Rhode Island
National Register of Historic Places in Newport County, Rhode Island